Spain competed at the 1948 Summer Olympics in London, England.  The nation returned to the Summer Games after missing the 1936 Games because of the Spanish Civil War. 65 competitors, all men, took part in 37 events in 11 sports.

Medalists

Silver
Jaime García, Marcelino Gavilán, and José Navarro — Equestrian, Jumping Team Competition

Athletics

Boxing

Equestrian

Hockey

Modern pentathlon

Three male pentathletes represented Spain in 1948.

 Alberto Moreiras
 José Luis Riera
 Manuel Bernabeu

Rowing

Spain had one male rowers participate in one out of seven rowing events in 1948.

 Men's single sculls
 Juan Omedes

Sailing

Shooting

Six shooters represented Spain in 1948.
Men

Swimming

Water polo

Art competitions

References

External links
Spanish Olympic Committee
Official Olympic Reports
International Olympic Committee results database

Nations at the 1948 Summer Olympics
1948
Oly